Primary State Highway 6 (PSH 6) was a Washington state highway in the older primary and secondary system that existed from 1937 until 1964 in Spokane and Pend Oreille counties.

PSH 6 was originally named State Road 23 in 1915 and ran from Spokane to Newport until it was extended to the Canada–US border in 1921. State Road 23 was renumbered to State Road 6 and later co-signed with US 195 from Spokane to Newport in 1926. US 195 was later replaced with US 2 when it was expanded west in 1946 and later was decommissioned in 1964, when a new system, the sign routes (later state routes) were introduced.

Route description

From the junction, the highway became co-signed with US 2 (formerly US 195 and US 10 Alternate and traveled northeast to intersect what was US 2 prior to 1955 in Mead. The roadway then turned north, paralleling railroad tracks that belonged to the Great Northern Railway (now owned by BNSF Railway), which it would parallel to Newport. At Colbert, an overpass over the road served another Great Northern Railway line where the current BNSF Railway left PSH 6; from Colbert, the roadway passed Chattaroy and Milan before it left Spokane County to enter Pend Oreille County.

Once in Pend Oreille County, the highway curved northeast past  (SSH 6B) and Diamond Lake, which also has a community named after the lake, into Newport. In Newport, the road turned north and intersected its branch route, which connected east to Idaho and US 2 left to become co-signed with the branch. After US 2 left, PSH 6 once again turned northwest along the Pend Oreille River and a former route of the Chicago, Milwaukee, St. Paul and Pacific Railroad (now the Pend Oreille Valley Railroad) to Usk, where SSH 6B was intersected again. From Usk, the roadway continued north past Cusick, Locke, Jared and Ruby to Tiger, where  branched off the highway and traveled west to Colville. The road traveled through Ione and Metaline to Metaline Falls, the terminus of the railroad and the last major community on the roadway until the Canada–US border. PSH 6 bridged the Pend Oreille River at Metaline Falls and traveled north to the Canada–US border, where it became  (BC 6). The southern terminus in Spokane was the busiest section of the highway in 1960, with a daily average of 4,850 motorists; the busiest section in Pend Oreille County was at Newport city limits with a daily average of 2,150 motorists in 1960.

History

PSH 6 was first established in 1915 as State Road 23 (SR 23) on a Spokane–Tiger route, which would be extended to the Canada–US border in 1921. In 1923, the road became SR 6 and was co-signed with U.S. Route 195 (US 195) from Spokane to Newport in 1926 during the creation of the U.S. routes. During the creation of the Primary and secondary state highways in 1937, SR 6 became PSH 6 and two secondary highways along with a short branch were created. A roadway extending from Colville to Tiger (PSH 6) became  (SSH 6A), a short bypass of Newport became  and a short connector to US 195 in Idaho within Newport became the branch. In 1946,  was also co-signed onto the highway, replacing , which had used the same route before 1946. The Washington State Legislature introduced a new system of highways in 1964 that replaced the Primary and secondary highways, including PSH 6.

Branch

The branch was designated in 1937 during the creation of the Primary and secondary system and became co-signed with US 195 in 1926 and US 2 in 1946, the former was later shortened south to Spokane by 1979.

Secondary State Highways

SSH 6A

From Colville, the highway passed the Colville Municipal Airport, a Dolomite mine and a sawmill before paralleling Pend Oreille Creek and passing the  Little Pend Oreille National Wildlife Refuge. From the wildlife refuge, the roadway paralleled the shoreline of Lake Thomas into Pend Oreille County and passed another mine to end at PSH 6 in Tiger. The road, named the Colville–Tiger Road, was established in 1937, even though a segment extending from a radar station south of Lake Thomas to the Pend Oreille County line wasn't built until after 1966. During the 1964 highway renumbering, SSH 6A became , which became  in 1973. The busiest segment on the highway was east of Colville with a daily average of 1,400 in 1960.

SSH 6B

From Diamond Lake, the highway traveled north past Davis Lake to end at PSH 6 in Usk, a community south of Cusick. The roadway was established in 1937 and became  during the highway renumbering in 1964, which became  in 1975. The busiest segment on the highway was the southern terminus near Diamond Lake, with a daily average of 600 in 1960.

Major intersections

Branch intersections

SSH 6A intersections

SSH 6B intersections

See also

Primary State Highways (Washington)

References

External links

Highways of Washington State
SSH 6A
SSH 6B

06
Transportation in Spokane County, Washington
Transportation in Pend Oreille County, Washington